Jan Skopeček (19 September 1925 – 27 July 2020) was a Czech actor and playwright.

Born in Litoměřice, Skopeček began his acting career in 1949, appearing in numerous plays. He was married to actress Věra Tichánková; the couple remained together until Tichánková's death in January 2014.

Skopeček died on 27 July 2020 at the age of 94.

Selected filmography
 Hroch (1973)
 Tam, kde hnízdí čápi (1975)

References

1925 births
2020 deaths
People from Litoměřice
Czech male film actors
Czech male television actors
Czech male stage actors
Czech people of Jewish descent
20th-century Czech male actors
21st-century Czech male actors
20th-century Czech dramatists and playwrights
Czech male dramatists and playwrights
Recipients of Medal of Merit (Czech Republic)